Yevgeni Viktorovich Ushakov (born 26 September 1992) is a Russian football midfielder. He plays for FC Zenit-Izhevsk.

Club career
He made his debut in the Russian Second Division for FC Oryol on 16 July 2012 in a game against FC Gubkin.

He made his Russian Football National League debut for FC Fakel Voronezh on 8 July 2017 in a game against FC Volgar Astrakhan.

References

External links
 
 
 

1992 births
Sportspeople from Oryol
Living people
Russian footballers
Association football midfielders
FC Fakel Voronezh players
FC Zenit-Izhevsk players
FC KAMAZ Naberezhnye Chelny players
FC Oryol players
FC Tyumen players
FC Akron Tolyatti players
Russian First League players
Russian Second League players